Koinothrix is a monotypic genus of West African dwarf spiders containing the single species, Koinothrix pequenops. It was first described by R. Jocqué in 1981, and has only been found in Cabo Verde.

See also
 List of Linyphiidae species (I–P)

References

Arthropods of Cape Verde
Endemic fauna of Cape Verde
Fauna of Santiago, Cape Verde
Linyphiidae
Monotypic Araneomorphae genera
Spiders of Africa